Aowin Municipal District is one of the nine districts in Western North Region, Ghana. Originally it was formerly part of the then-larger Aowin/Suaman District in 1988, which was created from the former Aowin-Amenfi District Council, until a small northwest part of the district was split off to create Suaman District on 28 June 2012; thus the remaining part has been renamed as Aowin District, which it was later elevated to municipal district assembly status on 16 November 2017 (effective 15 March 2018) to become Aowin Municipal District. The municipality is located in the southern part of Western North Region and has Enchi as its capital town.

References

Districts of the Western North Region